Dimitrios Komnos (born 1 February 1993) is a Greek professional footballer who plays as a left-back for German club SV Babelsberg 03.

Career statistics

Club

Notes

References

External links
Dimitris Komnos at FuPa

1993 births
Living people
Greek footballers
Greek expatriate footballers
Association football defenders
Football League (Greece) players
Regionalliga players
Levadiakos F.C. players
Panionios F.C. players
PAS Lamia 1964 players
A.E. Kifisia F.C. players
VFC Plauen players
FC Oberlausitz Neugersdorf players
SV Babelsberg 03 players
Greek expatriate sportspeople in Germany
Expatriate footballers in Germany
People from Magnesia (regional unit)
Footballers from the Peloponnese